Cordelia is a 1949 historical novel by the British writer Winston Graham. He wrote it for the Book of the Month Club and enjoyed commercial success in the United States. It is set in Manchester in the 1860s.

References

Bibliography
 Tony Lee Moral. Hitchcock and the Making of Marnie. Scarecrow Press, 2013.

1949 British novels
Novels by Winston Graham
British historical novels
Novels set in the 1860s
Novels set in Manchester
Ward, Lock & Co. books